Praia Pesqueira is a seaside village in Caué District on São Tomé Island in São Tomé and Príncipe. Its population is 201 (2012 census). The locality is located just south of Dona Augusta and 5 km southwest of São João dos Angolares.

Population history

References

Populated places in Caué District
Populated coastal places in São Tomé and Príncipe